Scott William Currie (born 2 May 2001) is an English cricketer. He made his Twenty20 debut on 27 August 2020, for Hampshire in the 2020 t20 Blast. Prior to his T20 debut, he was named in England's squad for the 2020 Under-19 Cricket World Cup. He made his first-class debut on 6 September 2020, for Hampshire in the 2020 Bob Willis Trophy. He made his List A debut on 22 July 2021, for Hampshire in the 2021 Royal London One-Day Cup.

References

External links
 

2001 births
Living people
English cricketers
Hampshire cricketers
Place of birth missing (living people)
Dorset cricketers